The 2022 World Judo Juniors Championships was held in Guayaquil, Ecuador, from 10 to 14 August 2022 as part of the IJF World Tour and during the 2024 Summer Olympics qualification period. The final day of competition featured a mixed team event, won by team Japan.

Schedule & event videos
The event aired on the IJF YouTube channel. Event draw was held on 9 August at 14:00. All times are local (UTC-5).

Medal summary
Source Results

Men's events

Women's events

Mixed
Source Results

Medal table

Prize money
The sums written are per medalist, bringing the total prizes awarded to 79,800$ for the individual contests and 20,000$ for the team competition.

References

External links
 

World Judo Junior Championships
 U21
World U21
Judo
Judo competitions in Ecuador
Judo
Judo